The Barnyard Collection was a series of coins minted in 1928. Designed by Percy Metcalfe, these coins were used as the first currency of the Irish Free State.

Coins of Ireland